The Jam were  an English mod revival/punk rock band formed in 1972 at Sheerwater Secondary School in Woking, Surrey. They released 18 consecutive Top 40 singles in the United Kingdom, from their debut in 1977 to their break-up in December 1982, including four number one hits. As of 2007, "That's Entertainment" and "Just Who Is the 5 O'Clock Hero?" remain the best-selling import singles of all time in the UK. They released one live album and six studio albums, the last of which, The Gift, reached number one on the UK Albums Chart. When the group disbanded in 1982, their first 15 singles were re-released and all placed within the top 100.

While the Jam shared the "angry young man" outlook and fast tempo of the mid-1970s British punk rock movement, in contrast with it the band wore smartly tailored suits reminiscent of English pop-bands in the early 1960s and incorporated mainstream 1960s rock and R&B influences into its sound, particularly from the Who's work of that period and also drew influence from the work of the Kinks and the music of American Motown. This placed the act at the forefront of the 1970s–1980s nascent Mod Revival movement. With many of the band's lyrics about working class life, Jam biographer Sean Egan commented that they "took social protest and cultural authenticity to the top of the charts."

The band drew upon a variety of stylistic influences over the course of their career, including 1960s beat music, soul, rhythm and blues and psychedelic rock, as well as 1970s punk and new wave. The trio were known for their melodic pop songs, their distinctly English flavour and their mod image. The band launched the career of Paul Weller, who went on to form the Style Council and later his solo career. Weller wrote and sang most of the Jam's original compositions and played lead guitar, using a Rickenbacker 330. Bruce Foxton provided backing vocals and prominent basslines, which were the foundation of many of the band's songs, including the hits "Down in the Tube Station at Midnight", "The Eton Rifles", "Going Underground" and "Town Called Malice" mainly using a Rickenbacker 4001 or a Fender Precision Bass, as well as, on rare occasions, an Epiphone Rivoli.

History

Formation (1972–1976)

The Jam formed  at Sheerwater Secondary School in Woking, Surrey, England, in 1972. The line-up consisted of Paul Weller on bass and lead vocals with various friends. They played their first gigs at Michael's, a local club. The line-up began to solidify in the mid-1970s with  Weller, guitarist/vocalist Steve Brookes and drummer Rick Buckler. In their early years, their sets consisted of covers of early American rock and roll songs by the likes of Chuck Berry and Little Richard. They continued in this vein until Weller discovered the Who's debut album My Generation and became fascinated with Mod music. As he said later, "I saw that through becoming a Mod it would give me a base and an angle to write from, and this we eventually did. We went out and bought suits and started playing Motown, Stax and Atlantic covers. I bought a Rickenbacker guitar, a Lambretta GP 150 and tried to style my hair like Steve Marriott's circa '66." Eventually Brookes left the band, but although they advertised for a new guitarist (Gary Webb later known as Gary Numan claims to have failed an audition) he was not replaced. Up to this point Weller had been playing bass and Foxton had been the band's second guitar player; he persuaded Foxton to take over bass duties and developed a combined lead/rhythm guitar style influenced by the Who's Pete Townshend as well as Dr. Feelgood guitarist Wilko Johnson. The line-up of Weller, Foxton, and Buckler would persist until the end of the Jam's career.

Throughout their career, the Jam were managed by Weller's father, John Weller, who then managed Paul's subsequent career until his death in 2009.

In the following two years, the Jam gained a small following around London from playing minor gigs, becoming one of the new lights on the nascent punk scene. In many ways, however, they stood out from their punk peers. Though they shared an "angry young men" outlook, short hair, crushing volume and lightning-fast tempos, the Jam wore neatly tailored suits where others wore ripped clothes, played professionally where others were defiantly amateurish, and displayed clear 1960s rock influences where others were disdainful (at least ostensibly) of such music (which had been a major influence on the "stadium rock" and "prog rock" of the 1970s). Indeed, the band were tagged by some journalists as "revivalists". They were signed to Polydor Records by Chris Parry in early 1977.

Early recordings (1977)
On 29 April 1977, Polydor released the Jam's debut single, "In the City", which charted in the Top 40 in the UK. On 20 May, the band released their debut album of the same name. The album, like those of the Clash and Sex Pistols, featured fast, loud and pointed songs. What set it apart from the records of those two bands was its more prevalent 1960s rock influences. The Jam covered Larry Williams's "Slow Down" (also covered by the Beatles) and the theme song of the 1960s TV series Batman, which was somewhat of a standard for 1960s rock bands. Their originals revealed the influence of Motown Records, the Beatles and the Who.

The Jam had political lyrics, condemning police brutality ("In the City") and expansionist development ("Bricks And Mortar"). However, one of their most openly political songs, "Time For Truth", bemoaned the decline of the British Empire and expressed disparaging sentiments about "Uncle Jimmy" (the Prime Minister, James Callaghan) in no uncertain terms ("Whatever happened to the great Empire?" / "I think it's time for truth, and the truth is you lost, Uncle Jimmy"). These pro-Empire sentiments and ostentatious displays of the Union Flag began to earn the group the tag of "Conservative".

After the non-LP single "All Around the World" nearly reached the UK Top 10, the Jam, having achieved a notable and loyal following in such a short time, were pressed to produce more material quickly. Their second album, This Is the Modern World, was released later in 1977. Bruce Foxton, generally considered a lesser songwriter than Weller, contributed two songs to the LP ("Don't Tell Them You're Sane" and "London Traffic"), both of which attracted criticism. His composing output gradually decreased, leaving Weller firmly established as the band's chief songwriter.

All Mod Cons (1978)
In March 1978, the Jam released "News of the World", a non-album single that was both written and sung by Foxton. It charted at No. 27 in the UK, and was the band's second biggest hit to date. This was the only Foxton solo composition to be released as a Jam A-side. When the band went back into the studio to record a third album of primarily Foxton contributions, their songs were dismissed by producers as poor, and they held off recording an album in hopes that Weller would once again find inspiration. "News of the World" is now used in the opening theme of the BBC television show Mock the Week.

Returning to his hometown of Woking, Weller spent much of his time listening to albums by the Kinks and coming up with new songs. The Jam released their next single, the double A-side "David Watts"/"'A' Bomb in Wardour Street". "David Watts" was a cover of a Kinks song, throughout which Weller and Foxton traded lead vocals. "'A' Bomb in Wardour Street" was a Weller original. One of their hardest and most intense songs, Weller cursed the violent thugs that plagued the punk rock scene over a taut two-chord figure. It became their most successful 7" since "All Around the World".

It was not until their next single, "Down in the Tube Station at Midnight", that the Jam really regained their former critical acclaim. The song was a dramatic account of being mugged by thugs who "smelled of pubs and Wormwood Scrubs and too many right-wing meetings". Around this time, the Jam slimmed their team of two producers to one, Vic Coppersmith-Heaven, who helped develop the group's sound with harmonised guitars and acoustic textures. In 1978, the Jam released their third LP, All Mod Cons, which included three previously released tracks among the 12 in total: "David Watts", "'A' Bomb In Wardour Street", and "Down in the Tube Station at Midnight". (It also contained two songs Polydor had previously rejected for single release, the manic "Billy Hunt" and the acoustic ballad "English Rose".)

Setting Sons & Sound Affects (1979–1981)
Following two successful and critically acclaimed non-LP singles, "Strange Town" and "When You're Young", the band released "The Eton Rifles" in advance of their new album. It became their first top 10, rising to No. 3 on the UK charts. November 1979 saw the release of the Setting Sons album, another UK hit, and their first chart entry in the US, albeit at 137 on the Billboard 200. The album began life as a concept album about three childhood friends, though in the end many of the songs did not relate to this theme. Many of the songs had political overtones; "The Eton Rifles" was inspired by skirmishes between demonstrators on a Right to Work March – a campaign initiated by the left-wing Socialist Workers Party – and pupils from Eton College; "Little Boy Soldiers" was an anti-war multi-movement piece in the vein of Ray Davies. Another notable song from the album was Bruce Foxton's "Smithers-Jones", originally a b-side to "When You're Young". The song is almost unanimously considered to be his greatest contribution to the Jam. Recorded with electric rock instrumentation for the single release, "Smithers-Jones" was given a complete makeover for the Setting Sons album with a string arrangement.

The band's first single of 1980 was intended to be "Dreams of Children", which combined bleak lyrics lamenting the loss of childhood optimism with hard-edged, psychedelic instrumental backing and production. Due to a labelling error, however, the A- and B-sides of the single were reversed, resulting in the more conventional "Going Underground", the single's planned flipside, getting much more airplay and attention. As a result, only "Going Underground" was initially listed on the charts, although the single was eventually officially recognised (and listed) as a double A-side by the time the release reached No. 1 in the UK. When promoting the album in the United States, the group appeared on American Bandstand, performing "(Love Is Like a) Heat Wave", a cover of the hit song by the Motown girl group Martha and the Vandellas. They also appeared on the short-lived American sketch comedy series Fridays, playing the songs "Private Hell" and “Start”.

Sound Affects was released in November 1980. Paul Weller said that he was influenced by The Beatles' Revolver and Michael Jackson's Off the Wall also. Indeed, several of the songs recall Revolver-era swirling psychedelia, such as "Monday", "Man in the Corner Shop", and the acoustic "That's Entertainment". According to Weller he wrote "That's Entertainment", a bitter slice-of-life commentary on the drudgery of modern working-class life, in around 15 minutes upon returning inebriated from the pub. Despite being only available as an import single, it peaked at No. 21 on the UK charts, an unprecedented feat. It is now arguably the Jam's most celebrated song. Despite the group's lack of commercial success in America, it even made American magazine Rolling Stones list of the 500 greatest songs of all time.

"Start!", released before the album, became another No. 1 single. It had a very similar bass line, rhythm guitar and guitar solo to The Beatles' Revolver cut "Taxman", but was arranged as an otherwise completely different song. Some contemporary American R&B influence, including Michael Jackson, show up in Buckler's driving beats that power the album (such as on "But I'm Different Now"), and most obviously in Foxton's funk-influenced bassline in "Pretty Green". The album also reveals influences of post-punk groups such as Wire, XTC, Joy Division, and Gang of Four. The album was a No. 2 hit in the UK and peaked at No. 72 on the US Billboard charts, their most successful American album.

The Gift and break-up (1981–1982)
Two non-LP singles, "Funeral Pyre" and "Absolute Beginners", abandoned the psychedelic pop of Sound Affects; "Absolute Beginners" (named after a cult novel of the same title) had a more R&B-flavoured sound, and "Funeral Pyre" was influenced by post-punk music. "Absolute Beginners" would reach No. 4 on the UK charts. While missing the US pop charts, its video received regular rotation on budding cable channel MTV. "Funeral Pyre" is built around Buckler's drumming, and aside from the Sound Affects track "Music for the Last Couple", is the only song in the group's catalogue that carries a joint Buckler/Foxton/Weller writing credit. "Funeral Pyre" and "Music for the Last Couple" are the only songs for which Buckler receives any writing credit.

The 1982 release The Gift – the band's final studio LP – was a massive commercial success, peaking at No. 1 on the UK charts while spending an unprecedented 16 weeks on the US Billboard Hot 100. It featured several soul, funk, and R&B-stylised songs; most notably the No. 1 hit "Town Called Malice", which boasts a Motown-style bassline somewhat reminiscent of The Supremes' "You Can't Hurry Love". The song included work by Keith Thomas and Steve Nichol, who later became well known as members of the R&B groups Legacy and Loose Ends respectively. "Town Called Malice", a reality-based tale about dealing with hardship in a small, downtrodden English town, is one of a handful of Jam songs Weller still performs (along with "That's Entertainment", "Man in the Corner Shop", "Strange Town", "Art School", "Start!" and "In the Crowd"). When "Town Called Malice" reached number one the group had the honour of performing both it and its double A-side, "Precious" on Top of the Pops – the only other band to be accorded this honour being the Beatles. After the string-laden soul ballad "The Bitterest Pill (I Ever Had to Swallow)" peaked at No. 2, the band followed with their finale and another No. 1, "Beat Surrender". The latter featured Tracie Young on vocals; a few months later, she also guested on The Style Council's debut single "Speak Like a Child".

To universal surprise, on 30 October 1982 Weller announced his intention to disband the Jam after a short concert tour of the UK had been completed. They also made their final appearances on Top of the Pops and The Tube to promote "Beat Surrender". The tour included five consecutive nights at the Wembley Arena, all of which sold out within twenty minutes of tickets becoming available. The last date on the original itinerary had been scheduled for 9 December 1982 at Guildford Civic Hall, close to the band's hometown of Woking. However, due to ticket demand, an additional date was added at the Brighton Conference Centre on 11 December 1982 for their last performance.

The decision to split was solely Weller's. Explaining at the time that he disliked the idea of continuing for as long as possible simply because they were successful, he later told the Daily Mirror in advance of a 2015 Sky documentary on the band, "I wanted to end it to see what else I was capable of, and I'm still sure we stopped at the right time. I'm proud of what we did but I didn't want to dilute it, or for us to get embarrassing by trying to go on forever. We finished at our peak. I think we had achieved all we wanted or needed to, both commercially and artistically." Weller's decision to move on, announced by his father, the band's manager, at an extraordinary band meeting in the summer of 1982, "came as a shock" to Buckler and Foxton, who wanted to keep the band together. Buckler told the Woking News and Mail in 2012: "It was like we were going to be driving over a cliff at the end of the year, and you keep thinking 'Well, maybe he'll change his mind'’." Both Buckler and Foxton described the experience as bitter, but in later years both expressed understanding, if not complete acceptance.

Following the split, Foxton did not speak to Weller for over 20 years, and Buckler said in 2015 that he still had not spoken to Weller since, despite repeated attempts by Buckler and Foxton in 1983 and 1984 to meet up with and talk to Weller. As the farewell tour neared its end, Polydor released a live album titled Dig the New Breed, a collection of songs from various concert performances over the band's five-year career which, while commercially successful, met with mixed reviews. The month after the final concert in Brighton, Polydor re-released all sixteen of the band's singles, nine of which re-entered the UK charts on 22 January 1983.

Post-split releases
Six different greatest hits albums by the Jam have also been released.

A five-CD box set Direction Reaction Creation, featuring all of the Jam's studio material (plus a disc of rarities) peaked at No. 8 on the UK Albums Chart upon its release in 1997; an unprecedented achievement for a box set. In 2002, Virgin Radio counted down the top 100 British music artists of all-time as polled by listeners and the Jam were No. 5 on the list. Weller made two other appearances in the poll; as part of The Style Council at No. 93 and as a solo artist at No. 21.

Post-split careers

In early 1983, Weller announced the formation of a new band, The Style Council, a duo with keyboard player Mick Talbot, formerly of the minor mod revival band The Merton Parkas. They would eventually split in 1989. He subsequently embarked on a successful career as a solo artist.

Following a short stint recording demos with Jake Burns and Dolphin Taylor, previously of Irish punk outfit Stiff Little Fingers, Bruce Foxton released his debut single "Freak" on Arista Records. Entering the UK Singles Chart at No. 34 on 30 July 1983, it eventually peaked at No. 23 and secured an appearance on Top of the Pops. Foxton's solo album Touch Sensitive followed in 1984, but subsequent singles "This Is The Way", "It Makes Me Wonder" and "SOS: My Imagination" failed to enter the Top 40. A final single "Play This Game To Win" was released on Harvest Records in November 1986.

Bruce Foxton went on to replace Ali McMordie in a reformed Stiff Little Fingers in 1990, remaining with the band until January 2006, when he quit to pursue other projects. Later that year he joined Simon Townshend (Pete Townshend's brother), and Mark Brzezicki and Bruce Watson (both of Big Country) in the band Casbah Club, which released an album called Venustraphobia.

After the Jam split, Rick Buckler formed Time UK with Jimmy Edwards and Ray Simone, formerly of Masterswitch, ex-Tom Robinson Band guitarist Danny Kustow and (briefly) former Radio Stars/Sparks bassist Martin Gordon. The band released three singles "The Cabaret", "Playground of Privilege" and "You Won't Stop" before folding. In 1986, Buckler and Foxton released the single "Entertain Me" under the name Sharp.

After the Jam split, Weller and Foxton reportedly did not speak to one another for 20 years. However, in June 2006, it was reported that Weller and Foxton met backstage at The Who's Hyde Park concert, and a ten-minute conversation ended with an embrace. Foxton claimed that the two became friends again in 2009 and this led to them collaborating for two tracks on Weller's solo album Wake Up the Nation in early 2010. In May 2010, Weller and Foxton appeared together on stage for the first time in 28 years at The Albert Hall in London, performing three songs together. However, Foxton ruled out a Jam reunion.

Buckler's "The Gift" (2006–present)
In 2006, Rick Buckler, who had not been playing for several years after Sharp quit, formed a band named The Gift playing material from The Jam with musicians Russell Hastings and David Moore. Russell Hastings, who spent many years as a local musician including a couple of years in a Jam tribute band, took on guitar and lead vocal duties. In 2006, Bruce Foxton performed on stage with The Gift at their concerts in Chichester, Brighton and Birmingham, which rekindled rumours of a full or partial reunion of the Jam in 2007, for the 30th anniversary of the band's signing.

Foxton's "From the Jam" (2007–present)

Bruce Foxton stayed on as bassist with the Gift, with David Moore moving to second guitar and keyboards. At this point the group changed its name to From the Jam. In a 2007 official press release, Foxton and Buckler announced they were working on a new album and UK tour. The tour sold out in ten days. Weller did not take part, and has publicly expressed his lack of interest in any type of reformation. In a 2006 interview with BBC Radio 6 Music, Weller stated a reunion of the Jam would "never, ever happen", and that reformations are "sad". He said: "Me and my children would have to be destitute and starving in the gutter before I'd even consider that, and I don't think that'll happen anyway ... The Jam's music still means something to people and a lot of that's because we stopped at the right time, it didn't go on and become embarrassing."

From the Jam toured the UK in late 2007, finishing with a concert at Brighton Centre on 21 December 2007 to mark the 25th anniversary of the Jam's final show. In February 2008, they toured the United States and Canada, selling out in Los Angeles, San Francisco, Vancouver, Toronto, Chicago and New York. In March 2008, they toured Australia and New Zealand – a first for Foxton and Buckler.

A complete concert, recorded at the London Astoria in December 2007, was released on DVD through London-based indie label Invisible Hands Music in November 2008. David Moore left the band in early 2009, releasing an album with Matt Douglass in April the following year on Invisible Hands Music, under the name The Squire Circle. Rick Buckler announced his departure from the band in late 2009.

In 2012, a new album, Back in the Room, was released under Bruce Foxton's name to generally favourable reviews. The band featured Bruce Foxton (bass/vocals) and Russell Hastings (guitar/vocals) with Mark Brzezicki of Big Country on drums. Released on Bass Tone Records, the album was recorded at Paul Weller's Black Barn studios, with Weller himself appearing on several tracks, including the lead single "Number Six". Other special guests on the album include Steve Cropper (Booker T and the M.G.'s) and Steve Norman (Spandau Ballet). A second single from the album, "Don't Waste My Time", was released on 28 April 2013. The follow-up album, Smash the Clock, once again recorded at Black Barn studios, featuring Wilko Johnson and other guests, was released on 18 March 2016.

About The Young Idea & This is the Modern World: exhibitions, documentary, CDs, DVDs (2015–2022)
From 26 June 2015, through 31 August 2015, an exhibition entitled The Jam: About the Young Idea ran  at Somerset House in London, as announced on 13 April 2015. For the very first time, all three members of the band, the Weller family and music archivist Den Davis have opened up their archives, especially for the show. Despite Foxton's reported hopes that the opening would bring all three together on stage for the first time since their 1982 split, Buckler did not attend. NME reported at the time that, while Foxton and Weller apparently reconciled no later than 2010, "Weller and Buckler are said to have not been in the same room since their band’s demise." The exhibition proved to be very popular and was extended until 27 September 2015. The exhibition was curated by Tory Turk, Nicky Weller (Paul's sister) and Russell Reader.

In September 2015, The Jam: About The Young Idea, the documentary film, directed by Bob Smeaton, was broadcast on Sky Arts, and packaged with a live 1980 Rockpalast DVD.

About The Young Idea at the Cunard Building in Liverpool was a much larger interactive experience, which picked up on the overwhelming success of the exhibition held at Somerset House. Drummer Rick Buckler was there on 1 July 2016 to open the exhibition, due to run until 25 September, but extended until 6 October due to popular demand.

Curators, Paul Weller's sister Nicky, Den Davies and Russell Reader, drew together a wide range of memorabilia including records, badges, gold discs, stage suits, original instruments, and down to more personal items provided by the band members. A free app allowed visitors to engage with the exhibits by scanning VCodes as well as letting music lovers save five of their favourite exhibits from the show to a mobile device to enjoy in their own time.

This is the Modern World opened in Valley Gardens Brighton. Curated by Nicky Weller, it was the biggest ever collection of previously unseen Jam & Style Council memorabilia and ran from 1 August to 29 August 2022.

Personnel

The Jam
(1972–1982)
 Paul Weller – vocals, lead guitar, bass guitar, keyboards, backing vocals
 Rick Buckler – drums, percussion
 Bruce Foxton – vocals, bass guitar, rhythm guitar, backing vocals

Other members
 Steve Brookes – lead guitar, vocals (1972–1976)
 Dave Waller –  rhythm guitar (1972–1973)

Additional personnel
 Tracie Young – backing vocals on "Beat Surrender"
 Jennie Matthias (The Belle Stars) duetted on vocals on "The Bitterest Pill (I Ever Had to Swallow)"
 Peter Wilson – piano, drums, keyboards, Hammond organ
 Steve Nichol – trumpet, Hammond organ
 Luke Tunney – trumpet
 Martin Drover – trumpet
 Keith Thomas – saxophone, soprano sax
 Afrodiziak – background vocals
 Russell Henderson – steel drums

The Gift
(2005–2007)

 Rick Buckler – drums, percussion
 Russell Hastings – vocals, guitar
 David Moore – bass guitar

Additional personnel
 Bruce Foxton – vocals, bass guitar

From the Jam
(2007–present)

Current members
 Bruce Foxton – vocals, bass guitar (2007–present)
 Russell Hastings – vocals, guitar (2007–present)
 Mike Randon – drums, percussion (2014–present)

Former members
 Rick Buckler – drums, percussion (2007–2009)
 David Moore – keyboards, guitar (2007–2009)
 Mark Brzezicki – drums, percussion (2009–2013, 2015)
 Steve Barnard – drums, percussion (2013–2014)

Additional personnel
 Paul Weller - Featured on Back in the Room
 Steve Norman - Featured on Back in the Room
 Steve Cropper - Featured on Back in the Room
 Wilko Johnson - Featured on Smash the Clock
 Simon Townshend - guitar; Features in occasional live shows
 Tom Van Heel - keyboards, guitar; Session musician who features in live shows

Timeline

Discography

Studio albums
 In the City (1977)
 This Is the Modern World (1977)
 All Mod Cons (1978)
 Setting Sons (1979)
 Sound Affects (1980)
 The Gift (1982)

"From the Jam" albums
released under "Bruce Foxton".
 Back in the Room (2012)
 Smash the Clock (2015)

Further reading

Egan, Sean (2018). Love With a Passion Called Hate: The Inside Story of the Jam. London: Askill Publishing. .

Articles:
The Jam articles - The Guardian
article about the Jam - The Guardian
Vanessa Thorpe, 25 years on, life in the Jam is revealed, The Guardian, 15 July 2007
'From the Jam' Billboard.com article

References

External links
The Jam fan – run by Rick Buckler
The Jam Information Pages History, lyrics, album covers, info
The Jam - BBC
"From the Jam":
From the Jam Official – Administrated by Guy Helliker

 
English new wave musical groups
English punk rock groups
British mod revival groups
English power pop groups
Musical groups disestablished in 1982
Musical groups established in 1972
British musical trios
Musical groups from Surrey
Polydor Records artists